Inside Out: Original Soundtrack is the soundtrack album to Disney/Pixar's 2015 film of the same name, produced by Pixar Animation Studios and Walt Disney Pictures. Directed by Pete Docter, the film featured musical score composed by Michael Giacchino. This is the second collaboration between Giacchino and Docter, after previously working on Up, which fetched the former, an Academy Award for Best Original Score. Giacchino termed the score as "more emotional in comparison to the score for Up" and also being "more personal" due to his experience on parenthood. The score was recorded within January and May 2015, and featured more orchestral and symphonic music accompanied by a range of instruments, from piano, guitar, drum, organ and harp.  

The score was digitally released by Walt Disney Records on June 16, 2015, and followed by a CD release on July 7. While the score album consisted of twenty-four tracks, an additional track "Lava" from the Pixar short film of the same title, which accompanied with the film's theatrical release, was included in the soundtrack list. A 7-disc vinyl album was released in 2016, with cover artworks depicting the different characters in the film and their emotions. The soundtrack received positive critical acclaim, and fetched numerous awards and nominations for Giacchino, including an Annie Award for Outstanding Achievement in Music in a Feature Production, International Film Music Critics Association Award for Best Original Score for an Animated Film and World Soundtrack Award for Film Composer of the Year. It is regarded as one of Giacchino's best scores in his discography.

Development 
Michael Giacchino was confirmed to score music for the film in late-May 2014. The producers first met with Giacchino to discuss the film's concept and screen it for him. In response, he composed an eight-minute suite of music, unconnected to the film, based on his emotions viewing it. Rivera remarked that as both Giacchino and Docter were musicians, and they discussed the film in terms of story and character. In accordance with its creative preference, a progressive soundscape was made by sound designer Ren Klyce, who was joined by Rivera. Docter took a four-year discussion where his piano sessions considered forgetfulness, and a chewing gum advertising jingle was disturbing.

The production of the score began in January 2015 and concluded that May, while simultaneously scoring for Disney's Tomorrowland and Jurassic World. While in the music session, Docter felt its score "bittersweet" and "nostalgic" after he "grew up playing the violin and bass". Giacchino wanted to create something more emotionally monumental for Inside Out's score, in comparison to his score from Up. In an interview to Screen Rant, Giacchino said "The simplest thing you can do is just be simple and it's always the hardest thing to do as well because the tendency is, for an emotional moment, is to pour on more and more and more but I learned over the years that it's actually the opposite [...] that's how I like the music to be there in those moments, it's almost as if a friend is there being with the character. So it may not end up being an incredibly melodic or soaring moment, but it doesn't need to be either." He called the score, as his most personal work following his experience of raising his daughter.

In a press release by Walt Disney Records, excerpts from Giacchino stated that "Pete [Docter] wanted the music to feel as if it was coming from the inside—from internal thoughts". He approached for an atmospheric score, rather than a traditional film score, as according to him, the goal of the music "to feel emotional" had mirrored the goal of the film. Giacchino said that "There’s a 1930s jazzy section we wrote for the Forgetters, and we channel classic horror in the Subconscious. The film really goes all over the map musically, but what I love most about it is that we never forgot that it’s an emotional story that’s being told." The score was recorded using a 70-piece orchestra at the Eastwood Scoring Stage at Warner Bros., with an organ and rhythm sections, consisting of guitarists and drummers.

Track listing

Chart performance

Release history

Awards and nominations

Notes

References

External links 
 Structure and Thematic Distribution in Pixar's Inside Out (2015) by Michael Giacchino and Andrew Simmons

2015 soundtrack albums
Animated film soundtracks
Pixar soundtracks
Walt Disney Records soundtracks
Michael Giacchino soundtracks